Eleventh Avenue is a north–south thoroughfare on the far West Side of the borough of Manhattan in New York City, located near the Hudson River. Eleventh Avenue originates in the Meatpacking District in the Greenwich Village and West Village neighborhoods at Gansevoort Street, where Eleventh Avenue, Tenth Avenue, and West Street intersect. It is considered part of the West Side Highway between 22nd and Gansevoort Streets.

Between 59th and 107th Streets, the avenue is known as West End Avenue. Both West End Avenue and Eleventh Avenue are considered to be part of the same road.

Description

Between Gansevoort Street and West 22nd Street, Eleventh Avenue is part of the West Side Highway, a very wide expressway. At a split with Twelfth Avenue/West Side Highway at West 22nd Street, Eleventh Avenue continues as a standard-width avenue.

Following the split, Eleventh Avenue is two-way traffic for access to 23rd Street, as well as for 24th Street to access Chelsea Piers. North of 24th Street, Eleventh Avenue is one-way southbound from 24th to 34th Streets, where two-way traffic resumes for access to the Lincoln Tunnel. The segment between approximately 39th and 59th Streets is home to the largest concentration of auto dealerships in Manhattan. Eleventh Avenue again becomes one-way southbound between 40th and 57th Streets; two-way traffic resumes north of 57th Street.

The portion north of 59th Street is called West End Avenue, which has mixed commercial and residential use. The northern  are a sedate Upper West Side residential street ending at Straus Park, 107th Street, and Broadway. Traffic is bidirectional, except for the northernmost block, north of 106th Street.

History
The West Side Line of the New York Central Railroad once had on-street running along part of Eleventh Avenue, which, along with Tenth Avenue, become known as "Death Avenue" because of the large number of deaths that occurred due to train–pedestrian collisions. In 1929, the city, the state, and New York Central agreed on the West Side Improvement Project, conceived by Robert Moses, and allocated funds for an elevated railway that would eliminate the grade crossings and alleviate the problems along Tenth and Eleventh Avenues; it also included construction of the West Side Elevated Highway.

Meanwhile, the avenue's West End Avenue section was originally created in the 1880s as the northern extension of Eleventh Avenue, and was intended to be a commercial street serving the residents of the mansions to be constructed along Riverside Drive. When West End Avenue was named in the 1880s, the Upper West Side was fairly sparsely populated, and that upper portion of the avenue, subsequently, was called the "West End" because of its separation from the core of the city. Seeking to distinguish the area from the factories and tenements below 59th Street, a group of real estate developers renamed the northern portions of the West Side's avenues.

Portions of both West End Avenue and Eleventh Avenue were run down in the mid-20th century, with single room occupancy hotels, prostitutes and drug addicts a common sight. The city's economic comeback in the 1980s brought recovery and gentrification.

The upper portion of the avenue retains stretches of late nineteenth-century town houses and several handsome churches and synagogues, but is almost entirely made up of handsome residential buildings about twelve stories tall built in the first decades of the twentieth century. The near total absence of retail on that part of the street marks its quiet, residential character, as opposed to the high-traffic, noisy character of Eleventh Avenue.

Architecture 

The architecture of buildings on Eleventh and West End Avenues differs significantly. West End Avenue is noteworthy for its almost unbroken street wall of handsome apartment buildings punctuated by brief stretches of nineteenth-century townhouses and several handsome churches and synagogues. Notable architecturally historicist houses of worship include:
 Ansche Chesed, in Byzantine Revival style
 Saint Ignatius of Antioch Episcopal Church in English Gothic revival style
 West End Collegiate Church in Dutch Colonial, a subset of Renaissance Revival style
 Annunciation Greek Orthodox Church

Among the more notable apartment buildings are:
 The Apthorp
 Cleburne Building at 105th Street
 520 West End Avenue, the former Leech mansion, which is now landmarked

Eleventh Avenue, meanwhile, is lined with new-age residential buildings – such as 100 Eleventh Avenue – adjacent to warehouses and car dealerships.

Between 34th and 59th Streets there are a number of new car dealerships including: Audi Manhattan, BMW of Manhattan, Cadillac of Manhattan, Chrysler-Dodge-Jeep-Ram Manhattan, Jaguar-Land Rover Manhattan, Lexus of Manhattan, Manhattan Motorcars, Mercedes-Benz Manhattan, Mini of Manhattan, Open Road Volkswagen, Toyota of Manhattan, and Volvo Cars Manhattan.  Additionally, numerous vehicle service stations, car washes, and car rental lots are found along this stretch.

This area has served the transport trade for more than a hundred years; most of the stables for New York's remaining horse cabs are located on its side streets, though many now store taxis and pedicabs. It is not uncommon to hear the clip clop of horses in the vicinity, as a result. The carriage horses live in historic stables originally built in the 19th century, but today boast the latest in barn design, such as fans, misting systems, box stalls, and state-of-the-art sprinkler systems. As horses always have in densely populated urban areas, the carriage horses live upstairs in their stables while the carriages are parked below on the ground floor.

Historic districts
One historic district lies on Eleventh Avenue, the West Chelsea Historic District, designated in 2008.

Two segments of West End Avenue lie within designated New York City historic districts: both sides of the avenue from West 87th to West 94th Streets can be found in the Riverside-West End Historic District. The west side of the avenue from West 75th Street through mid-block between West 78th and West 79th streets and the east side between West 76th and West 77th streets are contained within the West End-Collegiate Historic District. Concern over building demolition filings for the demolition of three row houses and a six-story elevator apartment building at the southwest corner of West End Avenue and West 86th Streets spurred a grassroots effort to seek historic district designation for the entire stretch north of Lincoln Towers from West 70th to West 107th streets. On March 18, 2009, the West End Avenue Preservation Society formally submitted a request for evaluation to the chair of the city's Landmarks Preservation Commission along with a 260-page survey prepared by Andrew Dolkart.

Points of interest
Points of interest on or within one block of Eleventh Avenue include:
3 Hudson Boulevard at 34th/35th Streets
15 Hudson Yards and attached Culture Shed (at 30th Street)
35 Hudson Yards (at 33rd Street)
55 Hudson Yards (between 33rd and 34th Streets)
100 Eleventh Avenue, designed by Jean Nouvel
200 Eleventh Avenue, corner of West 24th Street, designed by Annabelle Selldorf, includes apartments with a "Sky Garage", allowing cars to be parked directly outside the apartment.
Chelsea Market (between 9th and 10th Avenues and 15th and 16th Streets, one block east of 11th Avenue)
Chelsea Piers (from 18th to 23rd Streets along the West Side Highway segment of Eleventh Avenue)
Comedy Central
Former studios of The Colbert Report (at 54th Street)
Studios of The Daily Show (at 51st Street)
Former site of the Copacabana nightclub (at 34th Street); the nightclub is now at 47th Street in Midtown; site occupied by the 34th Street–Hudson Yards subway entrance 
DeWitt Clinton Park (between 52nd and 54th Streets)
The High Line (roughly parallel to Eleventh Avenue from Gansevoort Street to 34th Street)
The Hudson River Park (parallel to the West Side Highway segment of Eleventh Avenue from 11th Street to 22nd Street; also manages the Chelsea Waterside Park on the west side of Eleventh Avenue between 22nd and 24th Streets)
IAC Building (at 19th Street)
The Javits Center (between 34th and 39th Streets)
Michael J. Quill Bus Depot of the MTA (at 41st Street)
Pier 57 (at 15th Street)
Silver Towers (at 41st/42nd Streets)
Starrett-Lehigh Building (at 26th/27th Streets)
The Whitney Museum of American Art (at Gansevoort Street)

Points of interest on or within one block of West End Avenue include:
Abraham Joshua Heschel School's high school division (at 60th Street)
Calhoun School (between 80th and 81st Streets)
Collegiate School (between 77th and 78th Streets)
Lincoln Towers (between 66th and 70th Streets, with all buildings having West End Avenue addresses)
Pomander Walk (between 95th and 96th Streets)
Riverside Park (one block west of West End Avenue north of 72nd Street)
Straus Park (between 106th and 107th Streets)

Mass transit
Eleventh Avenue has been served by the New York City Subway's , built as part of the 7 Subway Extension, at a station under the avenue at 34th Street, since September 2015.

The New York City Bus's  route has served the avenue south of 57th Street since September 2014; plans for the bus route were formulated in early 2014. The M57 crosstown bus route serves West End Avenue between 57th Street and 72nd Street. Several crosstown bus routes, namely M14D+ Select Bus, M23+ Select Bus, M31, M34+ Select Bus, M66, M72, M86+ Select Bus, M96 and M106 use the road to loop around and change directions, with the exceptions being the M23+ and the M72.

Notable residents
Notable current and former residents include:
Judy Collins (born 1939), folk singer and song writer resides at 845 West End Avenue. 
Domenico Dolce is a noted resident of 200 Eleventh Avenue.
Tina Fey (born 1970), former SNL cast member and creator of NBC's 30 Rock lives on West End Avenue near 80th Street
Joseph Heller (1923–1990), wrote Catch-22 while living at 390 West End Avenue.
Elena Kagan (born 1960), Associate Justice of the Supreme Court of the United States, grew up on West End Avenue and 75th Street.
Nicole Kidman and Keith Urban live at 200 Eleventh Avenue.
Jesse L. Lasky (1880–1958), the theatrical and burlesque producer lived at 601 West End Avenue
Madeleine L'Engle (1918–2007), author, wrote A Wrinkle in Time and its sequels while living in the Cleburne Building at 924 West End Avenue.
Economist Ludwig von Mises (1881–1973) lived at 777 West End Avenue.
Anna Netrebko (born 1971), operatic soprano, has an apartment on the 32nd floor of 10 West End Avenue.
Estelle Parsons lived in the Cleburne Building
Norman Podhoretz and Midge Decter
Sergei Rachmaninoff (1873–1943) lived at 505 West End Avenue
The rural mansion of Isidor Straus and Ida Straus was located between West End and Broadway at 105th on the site of the present Cleburne Building.
L'Wren Scott, who died in early 2014, lived in 200 Eleventh Avenue up to her death.
Charlie Smalls, composer of The Wiz
Novelist Herman Wouk lived at 845 West End Avenue during his college years.

In popular culture
 The Prince of West End Avenue, a novel by Alan Isler, is based on West End Avenue
 The Mirror Has Two Faces, a film starring and directed by Barbra Streisand, was set in an apartment at 505 West End Avenue
 Way Out West (on West End Avenue), a song by Richard Rodgers and Lorenz Hart introduced in the 1937 musical Babes in Arms, was set along West End Avenue
 The IAC Building on Eleventh Avenue is featured in the movie The Other Guys, as well as Wall Street: Money Never Sleeps.
 The opening scene in the Will Smith movie "Hitch", takes place with Smith exiting an 865 West End Avenue apartment building.
Suzanne Vega's 2007 song "Zephyr and I" features West End Avenue, and spending time with graffiti writer Zephyr.

References

External links

 
11
Chelsea, Manhattan
Hell's Kitchen, Manhattan
Upper West Side
Hudson Yards, Manhattan
West Side Highway